Shana Muldoon Zappa (born July 25, 1977) is an American writer, designer, and creator of the animated series, Disney's Star Darlings.

Personal life
Shana Muldoon married Ahmet Zappa, in 2010. They have a daughter, Halo Violetta Zappa, and a son, Arrow D'Oro Leon Zappa.

References

External links

1977 births
Living people
American designers
Disney people
People from Palos Verdes, California
University of Southern California alumni
Screenwriters from California
American women television writers
American television writers
Zappa family